WWOS may refer to:

 Nine's Wide World of Sports, a long running sports anthology brand on Australian television
 WWOS (AM), a radio station (810 AM) licensed to serve Walterboro, South Carolina, United States
 WWOS-FM, a radio station (91.9 FM) licensed to serve St. George, South Carolina